The 2014–15 Delaware Fightin' Blue Hens women's basketball team represents the University of Delaware during the 2014–15 NCAA Division I women's basketball season. The Fightin' Blue Hens, led by nineteenth year head coach Tina Martin, play their home games at the Bob Carpenter Center and were members of the Colonial Athletic Association. They finished the season 15–17, 8–10 CAA play to finish in seventh place. They advanced to the semifinals of the CAA women's tournament where they lost to Hofstra.

Roster

Schedule

|-
!colspan=9 style="background:#00539f; color:#FFD200;"| Regular season

|-
!colspan=9 style="background:#00539f; color:#FFD200;"| CAA Tournament

See also
2014–15 Delaware Fightin' Blue Hens men's basketball team

References

External links

Delaware Fightin' Blue Hens women's basketball seasons
Delaware
2014 in sports in Delaware
Hen